Hymenolepis may refer to:

 Hymenolepis (plant)
 Hymenolepis (tapeworm)